John Earl Reese (October 9, 1939 – October 23, 1955) was an African American teenager who was murdered in Gregg County, Texas.

Reese's killing is considered by authorities today to have been a hate crime, designed to thwart the creation of a new school in the community.

Death and afterward 
On October 22, 1955, Reese, along with his cousins Joyce Faye Crockett Nelson and Johnnie Crockett, were dancing in a local cafe.  Two white men, Joe Simpson and Perry Dean Ross, shot the teenagers from a passing car.  His cousins survived, but Reese died the next day.

The two suspects shot up some homes and churches before being arrested.  Ross, the shooter in the Reese murder, was convicted of murder, and given a five-year suspended sentence. Simpson was indicted but the charge was dismissed.

The Civil Rights and Restorative Justice Project has taken the following steps in response to Reese's murder:

 amending the death certificate from accident to homicide
 overseeing the creation of new gravestones.
 renaming a local street to John Earl Reese Road

Further reading 

 The Trouble I've Seen 
 "John Earl Reese - Killing Solved" news clipping
 Teen's 1955 death identified as early civil rights killing

References 

Civil rights movement
1955 deaths
1939 births
People from Gregg County, Texas
Deaths by firearm in Texas
Murdered African-American people
Murdered American children
People murdered in Texas
Male murder victims
History of racism in Texas